The Committee was a San Francisco-based improvisational comedy group founded by Alan Myerson and Jessica Myerson (formerly known as Irene Ryan and Irene Riordan, later known as Latifah Taormina).  The Myersons were both alums of The Second City in Chicago.  The Committee opened April 10, 1963 at 622 Broadway in a 300-seat Cabaret theater that used to be an indoor bocce ball court in San Francisco's North Beach.

Garry Goodrow, Hamilton Camp, Larry Hankin, Kathryn Ish, Scott Beach and Ellsworth Milburn were the cast. Jerry Mander handled the group's PR, and Richard Stahl, who later joined the improv troupe, was its first company manager. Jessica Myerson joined the company in May. Arthur Cantor took the company to Broadway in New York in 1964 for a limited engagement at the Henry Miller Theater. This occasioned a second group to hold the fort in San Francisco. Morgan Upton, Peter Lane, Leigh French, Chris Ross, Howard Hesseman (who was then using the name Don Sturdy),  Nancy Fish, Peter Bonerz and Carl Gottlieb became the mainstays of the San Francisco troupe. Roger Bowen, a founding member of both The Compass Players and The Second City, joined in 1966. John Brent, co-creator with Del Close of the How to Speak Hip album and a bit player in many movies (Catch-22, American Graffiti, More American Graffiti, Bob & Carol & Ted & Alice, Steelyard Blues, Porklips Now), was also a member.

When the Broadway troupe returned to San Francisco, they became the resident company of The Committee Theatre on Montgomery Street. This was a short-lived endeavor that saw three productions mounted there: A Fool's Play, by founding member Larry Hankin; MacBird!, by Barbara Garson; and America Hurrah, by Jean-Claude van Itallie. Joseph Chaikin of La MaMa Experimental Theatre Club and van Itallie came to San Francisco to direct and oversee that production.

The Montgomery Street theater also quietly hosted a new publication in its basement: Ramparts magazine edited by Robert Scheer (now of Truthdig). By this time, The Committee was a regular at civil rights and anti-war protests—along with Joan Baez, Norman Mailer, and others.

Actors were now taking classes and forming other troupes. More and more members came in and out of the improv group or the theater troupe as needed. Mimi Fariña, Dan Barrows, Ed Greenberg, Julie Payne, Ruth Silviera, Jim Cranna, Bruce Mackey and David Ogden Stiers became part of the improvisational troupe. A regular behind the scenes stage manager and performer who later successfully formed his own improvisational theater company in Los Angeles, The Groundlings, was Gary Austin.

In the late 1960s, The Committee was asked to form another company to perform in Los Angeles. Peter Bonerz, Mel Stewart, Barbara Bosson, Jessica Myerson, Richard Stahl, Kathryn Ish, Garry Goodrow, Howard Hesseman, Carl Gottlieb, Chris Ross and Rob Reiner were the stalwarts in Los Angeles. The group contributed voiceovers to Garson Kanin's 1969 comedy-drama "Where It's At." In 1971, six members of The Committee, including Scott Beach and Terry McGovern, improvised the off-screen dialogue for George Lucas's THX-1138, out of which emerged the name Wookiee due to McGovern's improvisation "I think I just ran over a Wookie back there." The revolving group of players presented satirical political comedy in San Francisco until 1972.

Committee members Alan and Jessica Myerson, Hesseman, Ed Greenberg and Richard Stahl were all cast in Tom Laughlin's counterculture action drama Billy Jack in 1971, which became a surprise hit and boosted their visibility. The façade of their theater during the run of their show "Sex Is Revolting" appears in the 1974 film "Freebie and the Bean"

The alumni who advanced to higher profiles include: improv guru Del Close, who later worked with Saturday Night Live players like Bill Murray; Howard Hesseman, who later played Dr. Johnny Fever on the television sitcom WKRP in Cincinnati; and Peter Bonerz, who later played orthodontist Jerry Robinson on The Bob Newhart Show and who became a television director. Leigh French became a regular on The Smothers Brothers Comedy Hour and later established her own voice-over looping company. Roger Bowen played Col. Blake in the movie M*A*S*H and wrote 11 novels. Carl Gottlieb co-wrote the screenplay for Jaws with Peter Benchley. Alan Myerson was nominated for an Emmy and Directors Guild of America directing awards during a long career in television and movies. David Ogden Stiers was nominated for two Emmy awards for his time on M*A*S*H.

The Committee performed 13 shows a week and was dark on Mondays when they let other groups use the space. In this way, The Committee hosted an early performance of The Warlocks before they became the Grateful Dead as well as the debut performance of Michael McClure's The Beard.

A filmed performance was released theatrically as A Session with the Committee in 1969.

Three record albums were released of The Committee recordings. The first was self-released in 1963, and the second was released on Reprise Records (FS-2023) as 'an original cast album' in 1964. Both were produced by Alan Myerson.
A third LP of ten of their improvised routines, entitled The Committee: Wide World Of War, was released in 1973 on Little David Records (LD 1007), a label known for releasing albums by comedians Flip Wilson, the label's founding owner, and George Carlin, who later bought the label.

References

External links
 The Committee An evening with the San Francisco repertory theatre company "whose forte is comic improvisions and set pieces". Narrated and produced by Jack Nessel, technical production by John Whiting. 1965

American comedy troupes
Comedy collectives
Improvisational troupes
Theatre companies in San Francisco
Performing groups established in 1963
1963 establishments in California
1960s in comedy